Michael Glöckle is a German slalom canoeist who competed in the late 1980s and early 1990s. He won a silver medal in the K-1 team event at the 1991 ICF Canoe Slalom World Championships in Tacen.

References

German male canoeists
Living people
Year of birth missing (living people)
Medalists at the ICF Canoe Slalom World Championships